Dying to Know
Dying to Know: Ram Dass & Timothy Leary 2014 documentary film about Ram Dass and Timothy Leary
"Dying to Know", song by Pennywise from Unknown Road
"Dying to Know", song by Clawfinger from Life Will Kill You
"Dying to Know", song by Arrogance from Rumors (album)
"Dying to Know", song by Tegan and Sara from Love You to Death (album)
Dying to Know You (2012) Aidan Chambers